Rachel C. Brown (born 1970) is a New Zealand scientist, professor and deputy head of the Department of Human Nutrition at the University of Otago.

Academic career 
Born in 1970, Brown completed a BSc, MSc and PhD (1999) at the University of Otago and joined the university's staff. In December 2019 she, along with two of her colleagues Lisa Houghton and Caroline Horwath, was promoted to full professor with effect from 1 February 2020.

Her research has focused on the dietary benefits of consuming nuts and nutrition for sports people. Her recent studies have compared popular diets—intermittent fasting, Paleolithic and Mediterranean—in a weight-loss trial; looked at the science behind nut activation; and risk of eating disorders among rugby union players as a result of poor body image. Her teaching is in obesity and its effect on heart disease.

Selected works

References

External links 

 

1970 births
Living people
University of Otago alumni
Academic staff of the University of Otago
New Zealand women academics